The IX (unclassified–miscellaneous) hull classification symbol is used for ships of the United States Navy that do not fit into one of the standard categories. Similar lists of 'miscellaneous' ships can found at 
 
and 
.

Ship status is indicated as either currently active [A] (including ready reserve), inactive [I], or precommissioning [P]. Ships in the inactive category include only ships in the inactive reserve, ships which have been disposed from US service have no listed status. Ships in the precommissioning category include ships under construction or on order; IX ships are generally not ordered as such, but are rather converted from other roles.

Historical overview

These vessels usually fall into these categories:

 Armed decoys (Q-ships)
 Experimental vessels
 Former yachts
 Mobile base vessels used by service squadrons (command ships, barracks ships, bulk storage ships, unnamed barges, and floating shipyard equipment)
 Retired warships
 Training equipment and simulators (including two Great Lakes-based paddlewheel aircraft carriers)
 War prizes

Unclassified miscellaneous vessels (IX) 

 Annapolis (IX-1), ex-PG-10
 Dispatch (IX-2), ex-Boston, protected cruiser
 Briarcliff (IX-3), receiving ship
 , ex-BM-10
 Alton (IX-5), ex-CA-14, ex-CL-14
 Coastal Battleship Number 4 (IX-6), ex-BB-4
 Commodore (IX-7), receiving ship, armory
 Cumberland (IX-8), receiving ship
 Dubuque (IX-9), ex-AG-6, later PG-17
 Essex (IX-10), ex-sloop of war, receiving ship
 Gopher (IX-11), ex-Fern, training ship, sank while under tow 21 September 1923
 Hancock (IX-12), ex-AP-3, receiving ship
 Hartford (IX-13), Civil War relic
 Hawk (IX-14), ex-PY-2
 Prairie State (IX-15), ex-BB-7
 , ex-BM-9
 Monadnock (IX-17), ex-BM-3
 Nantucket (IX-18), ex-PG-23
 Newport (IX-19), ex-PG-12
 Constellation (IX-20), museum ship
 Constitution (IX-21) [A], later 'none' classification as museum ship still in commission
 Oregon (IX-22), ex-BB-3
 Paducah (IX-23), ex-AG-7, later PG-18
 Philadelphia (IX-24), ex-C-4
 Reina Mercedes (IX-25), Spanish-American war prize
 Southery (IX-26)
 Sturgeon Bay (IX-27)
 Wheeling (IX-28), ex-PG-14
 Wilmette (IX-29)
 , ex-PG-8
 , ex-Michigan
 Yantic (IX-32)
 Newton (IX-33), ex-ID-4306
 Henry County (IX-34)
 Topeka (IX-35), ex-PG-35
 Light Target Number 2 (IX-36), ex-DD-136, later DMS-2, AG-19
 Light Target Number 3 (IX-37), ex-DD-275
 Empire State (IX-38), ex-AG-11
 Seattle (IX-39), ex-CA-11
 Olympia (IX-40), ex-CL-15, later museum ship
 America (IX-41), converted yacht
 Camden (IX-42), ex-AS-6
 Freedom (IX-43), converted yacht
 Damage Control Hulk Number 1 (IX-44), ex-DD-163
 Favorite (IX-45)
 Transfer (IX-46)
 Vamarie (IX-47), converted yacht
 Highland Light (IX-48), converted yacht
 Spindrift (IX-49), converted yacht
 Bowdoin (IX-50), converted yacht, former Arctic research vessel
 Sea Otter I (IX-51)
 Cheng Ho (IX-52), converted yacht
 Sea Otter II (IX-53)
 Galaxy (IX-54)
 Black Douglas (IX-55), ex-PYc-45
 , ex-AT-52
 Araner (IX-57), converted yacht
 Dwyn Wen (IX-58), converted yacht
 Volador (IX-59), converted yacht
 Seaward (IX-60), converted yacht
 Geoanna (IX-61), converted yacht
 Vileehi (IX-62), converted yacht
 Zahma (IX-63), converted yacht
 Wolverine (IX-64), ex-SS Seeandbee, Great Lakes Aircraft Training Carrier (CV)
 Blue Dolphin (IX-65), converted yacht
 Migrant (IX-66), converted yacht
 Guinevere (IX-67), converted yacht (note duplicated number)
 Burleson (IX-67), ex-APA-67 (note duplicated number)
 Seven Seas (IX-68), converted yacht
 Puritan (IX-69), converted yacht
 Gloria Dalton (IX-70), converted yacht
 Kailua (IX-71), ex-CS Dickenson (cable ship)
 Liberty Belle (IX-72)
 Zaca (IX-73), converted yacht
 Metha Nelson (IX-74), converted yacht
 John M. Howard (IX-75), ex-Elsie Fenimore converted yacht
 Ramona (IX-76), converted yacht
 Juniata (IX-77), converted yacht
 Brave (IX-78), converted yacht
 El Cano (IX-79), converted yacht
 Christiana (IX-80), seaplane tender, later YAG-32
 Sable (IX-81), ex-SS Greater Buffalo, Great Lakes Aircraft Training Carrier (CV)
 Luster (IX-82), converted yacht
 Ashley (IX-83), converted yacht
 Congaree (IX-84), converted yacht
 Euhaw (IX-85), converted yacht
 Pocotaligo (IX-86), converted yacht
 Saluda (IX-87), converted yacht, sound test ship, later YAG-87
 Wimbee (IX-88), converted yacht
 Romain (IX-89), converted yacht
 Forbes (IX-90), converted yacht
 Palomas (IX-91), converted yacht
 Liston (IX-92), converted yacht
 Irene Forsyte (IX-93), converted yacht, Q-ship (armed decoy)
 Ronaki (IX-94), converted yacht, grounded eastern Australia, 18 June 1943
 Echo (IX-95), converted yacht
 Richard Peck (IX-96), electric generator
 Martha's Vineyard (IX-97)
 Moosehead (IX-98), ex-DD-259, ex-YW-56, combat information center training ship
 Sea Cloud (IX-99), ex-WPG-284 weather ship
 Racer (IX-100), ex-PC-501, SC-501
 Big Chief (IX-101)
 Majaba (IX-102), ex-SS El Capitan, ex-AG-43
 E.A. Poe (IX-103), mobile base dry storage
 Peter H. Burnett (IX-104), mobile base dry storage
 Panther (IX-105), ex-SC-1470
 Greyhound (IX-106), ex-ID-1672
 Zebra (IX-107), later AKN-5
 Atlantida (IX-108)
 Antelope (IX-109), mobile base dry storage
 Ocelot (IX-110), mobile base command ship, wrecked by Typhoon Louise Okinawa October 1945
 Armadillo (IX-111), ex-SS Sidney Howard, mobile base storage tanker
 Beagle (IX-112), ex-SS David Rittenhouse, mobile base storage tanker
 Camel (IX-113), ex-SS William H. Carruth, mobile base storage tanker
 Caribou (IX-114), ex-SS Nathaniel Palmer, mobile base storage tanker
 Elk (IX-115), ex-SS William Winter, mobile base storage tanker
 Gazelle (IX-116), ex-SS Cyrus K. Holliday, mobile base storage tanker
 Gemsbok (IX-117), ex-SS Carl R. Gray, mobile base storage tanker
 Giraffe (IX-118), ex-SS Sanford B. Dole, mobile base storage tanker
 Ibex (IX-119), ex-SS Nicholas Longworth, mobile base storage tanker
 Jaguar (IX-120), ex-SS Charles T. Yerkes, mobile base storage tanker
 Kangaroo (IX-121), ex-SS Paul Tulane, mobile base storage tanker
 Leopard (IX-122), ex-SS William B. Bankhead, mobile base storage tanker
 Mink (IX-123), ex-SS Judah Touro, mobile base storage tanker
 Moose (IX-124), ex-SS Mason L. Weems, mobile base storage tanker
 Panda (IX-125), ex-SS Opie Read, mobile base storage tanker
 Porcupine (IX-126), mobile base storage tanker, sunk by kamikaze 30 December 1944, 7 killed
 Raccoon (IX-127), mobile base storage tanker
 Stag (IX-128), mobile base distilling ship, later AW-1
 Whippet (IX-129), mobile base storage tanker
 Wildcat (IX-130), mobile base distilling ship, later AW-2
 Abarenda (IX-131), ex-SS Acme, mobile base storage tanker
 Andrew Doria (IX-132), ex-SS Aleibiades
 Antona (IX-133), ex-SS Birkenhead
 Arayat (IX-134), ex-SS Faireno, mobile base storage tanker
 Arethusa (IX-135), ex-SS Gargoyle, mobile base storage tanker
 Carondelet (IX-136), ex-SS Gold Heels, mobile base storage tanker
 Celtic (IX-137), ex-SS Kerry Patch
 Malvern (IX-138), ex-SS Orissa
 Octorara (IX-139), ex-SS Purisima, mobile base storage tanker
 Quiros (IX-140), ex-SS Osmand
 Manileno (IX-141)
 Signal (IX-142), ex-ID-1532, mobile base storage tanker
 Silver Cloud (IX-143), ex-AO-10, mobile base storage tanker
 Clyde (IX-144)
 Villalobos (IX-145)
 Fortune (IX-146), mobile base aviation stores ship, later AVS-2
 Supply (IX-147), mobile base aviation stores ship, later AVS-1
 North Star (IX-148), ex-WPG-59
 Trefoil (IX-149), barge
 Quartz (IX-150), barge
 Silica (IX-151), barge, wrecked by Typhoon Louise Okinawa October 1945
 Carmita (IX-152), ex-Slate, barge
 Asphalt (IX-153), barge, wrecked 6 October 1944
 Bauxite (IX-154), barge
 Mustang (IX-155), ex-William H. Smith (fishing schooner)
 City of Dalhart (IX-156), construction battalion (Seebee) command ship, Brodie landing system installed
 Orvetta (IX-157), ex-Tampa, mobile base barracks 
 Limestone (IX-158), barge
 Feldspar (IX-159), barge
 Marl (IX-160), barge
 Barite (IX-161), barge
 Lignite (IX-162), barge, wrecked by Typhoon Louise Okinawa October 1945
 Cinnabar (IX-163), barge
 Corundum (IX-164), barge
 Flicker (IX-165), ex-AM-70
 Linnet (IX-166), ex-AM-76
 Leyden (IX-167), transport
 Southland (IX-168), transport
 President Warfield (IX-169), transport, later SS Exodus 
 Curlew (IX-170), ex-AM-69
 Albatross (IX-171), ex-AM-71
 Bluebird (IX-172), ex-AM-72
 Etamin (IX-173), ex-AK-93
 Grumium (IX-174), ex-AK-112, mobile base aviation stores ship, later AVS-3
 Kestrel (IX-175), ex-AMc-5
 Kingbird (IX-176), ex-AMc-56
 Nightingale (IX-177), ex-AMc-149
 Banshee (IX-178), ex-SS Fairbanks
 Kenwood (IX-179)
 Flamingo (IX-180), ex-AMc-22
 Egret (IX-181), ex-AMc-24
 Donnell (IX-182), ex-DE-56, electric generator
 Catbird (IX-183), ex-AM-68, mine testing
 Clifton (IX-184), ex-SS Dilworth
 Stonewall (IX-185), ex-SS Frank G. Drum
 Dawn (IX-186), mobile base storage tanker
 Belusan (IX-187), ex-SS Vistula
 Chotauk (IX-188), ex-SS American Arrow, mobile base storage tanker
 Marmora (IX-189), ex-SS F.C. Fitzsimmons, mobile base storage tanker
 Nausett (IX-190), ex-SS W.M. Irish, mobile base storage tanker
 Vandalia (IX-191), ex-SS Walter Jennings, mobile base storage tanker, wrecked by Typhoon Louise Okinawa October 1945
 Flambeau (IX-192), ex-SS S.B. Hunt, mobile base storage tanker
 Meredosia (IX-193)
 Killdeer (IX-194), ex-AMc-21
 Goshawk (IX-195), ex-AM-79
 Spark (IX-196), ex-LST-340
 Mariveles (IX-197)
 Cohasset (IX-198), ex-LST-129
 Barcleo (IX-199), ex-AMb-17, ex-YP-375
 Maratanza (IX-200), ex-YP-448
 Sterling (IX-201), ex-YP-449
 Liberator (IX-202), ex-AMc-87
 Agile (IX-203), ex-AMc-111
 Allioth (IX-204), ex-AK-109, mobile base aviation stores ship, later AVS-4
 Callao (IX-205), German icebreaker war prize Externsteine
 Chocura (IX-206), ex-PC-452
 Big Horn (IX-207), ex-AO-45, Q-ship (armed decoy)
 Domino (IX-208), mobile base dry storage, not acquired
 Seaward (IX-209), ex-LST-278
 Sea Foam (IX-210), mobile base storage tanker
 Castine (IX-211), ex-PC-452, experimental engine
 IX-212, ex-LCI(G)-396
 Serapis (IX-213), ex-SS District of Columbia, mobile base storage tanker
 Yucca (IX-214), ex-SS Utacarbon
 Don Marquis (IX-215), mobile base dry storage
 Unicoi (IX-216), mobile base dry storage
 Tackle (IX-217), ex-ARST-4
 Gardoqui (IX-218), mobile base storage tanker
 Eureka (IX-221), ex-PC-488
 Pegasus (IX-222), ex-AK-48, mobile base dry storage
 Triana (IX-223), mobile base dry storage
 Aide de Camp (IX-224), sonar research, converted yacht
 Harcourt (IX-225)
 Araner (IX-226)
 Gamage (IX-227) - same ship as Inca (IX-229)
 Justin (IX-228)
 Inca (IX-229), mobile base dry storage
 Tapacola (IX-230), ex-AMc-54, target tug
 Stalwart (IX-231), ex-AMc-105, target tug
 Summit (IX-232), ex-AMc-106, target tug
 , sonar test schooner
 , German racing yacht war prize
 , Naval Academy yacht
IX-236 through IX-299 unused
 Prinz Eugen (IX-300), German cruiser war prize
 Dithmarschen (IX-301), German replenishment oiler war prize, later USS Conecuh (AO-110 / AOR-110)
 Atlanta (IX-304), ex-CL-104, weapons effects test ship
 Prowess (IX-305), ex-AM-280, ex-MSF-280, training ship
 USS IX-306, ex-US Army FS-221
 Brier (IX-307),  ex-WLI-299
 New Bedford (IX-308), ex-US Army FS-289, ex-AKL-17, Texas Towers support ship, torpedo testing
 Monob One (IX-309), ex-YW-87, later YAG-61
 USS IX-310, sonar test barge
 Benewah (IX-311), ex-APB-35
 Horst Wessel (IX-327), German barque war prize, later USCGC Eagle (WIX-327)
IX-328 through IX-500 unused
 Elk River (IX-501), ex-LSM-501, ex-LSMR-501, barracks ship
 Mercer (IX-502), ex-APB-39
 Nueces (IX-503), ex-APB-40
 , ex-APL-37, ex-APB-37
 IX-505, ex-YTM-759
 IX-506, ex-YFU-82
 , ex-AP-121
 Orca (IX-508), ex-LCU-1618, ROV/AUV test support
 USS Underwater Explosives Barge Number 1 (IX-509)
 USS IX-510, ex-T-AP-127, barracks hulk
 USS IX-511, ex-LST-399
 IX-512, ex-US Army BD 6651
 IX-513, EMPRESS II (Electromagnetic Pulse Environment Simulator for Ships)
 Baylander (IX-514), ex-YFU-79, 1986 conversion to a helicopter Landing Ship for pilot training, nicknamed the "world's smallest aircraft carrier"
 IX-515, ex-WSES-1 (surface effect ship)
 IX-516, 3-story classroom Trident missile training barge
 Gosport (IX-517), ex-Pacific Escort, ex-Thomas G. Thompson
 Proteus (IX-518), ex-AS-19, berthing craft
 USS IX-519, ex-YC-1643, boat landing stage
 USS IX-520, ex-APL-19
 USS IX-521, ex-AFDB-1, section D
 USS IX-522, ex-ABSD-2, ex-AFDB-2, section D, target support barge
 USS IX-523, ex-YOG-93, training hulk (boarding party tactics)
 USS IX-524, ex-ABSD-2, ex-AFDB-2, section F, target support barge
 USS IX-525, ex-AFDB-1, section C 
 USS IX-526, ex-YRST-1, later YR-94
 USS IX-527, ex-YFN-1259, submarine test support barge
 USS IX-528, ex-YR-55, ex-YRDH-1, submarine test support barge
 Sea Shadow (IX-529), radar stealth technology demonstrator
 USS IX-530, ex-YFN-268, ex-YFND-5
 USS IX-531, ex-YP-679
 Joint Venture (IX-532), experimental high speed transport
 USS IX-533, ex-US Army BD 6652, ex-YD-222
 USS IX-534, ex-ABSD-2, ex-AFDB-2, section B
 USS IX-535, ex-ABSD-2, ex-AFDB-2, section H
 USS IX-536
  [A], ex-AGOS-8
 USS IX-538
 USS IX-539
 Neodesha (IX-540) [A], ex-YTB-815
 USS IX-541
 USS White Bush (IX-542), ex-YF-339, ex-WLM-542
 USS IX-543
 USS IX-544
 USS IX-545, ex-YTB-814

Unclassified miscellaneous submarines (IXSS) 

A number of submarines were briefly given the IXSS hull symbol in 1971 prior to their disposal, nearly all had previously held the AGSS designation. 

 Cod (IXSS-224), ex-SS-224, AGSS-224
 Rasher (IXSS-269), ex-SS-269, SSR-269, AGSS-269
 Bowfin (IXSS-287), ex-SS-287, AGSS-287
 Ling (IXSS-297), ex-SS-297, AGSS-297, museum ship
 Lionfish (IXSS-298), ex-SS-298, AGSS-298, museum ship
 Roncador (IXSS-301), ex-SS-301, AGSS-301
 Perch (IXSS-313), ex-SS-313, SSP-313, ASSP-313, APSS-313, LPSS-313
 Charr (IXSS-328), ex-SS-328, AGSS-328
 Carp (IXSS-338), ex-SS-338, AGSS-338
 Chopper (IXSS-342), ex-SS-342, AGSS-342
 Pampanito (IXSS-383), ex-SS-383, AGSS-383
 Torsk (IXSS-423), ex-SS-423, AGSS-423
 Runner (IXSS-476), ex-SS-476, AGSS-476
 Requin (IXSS-481), ex-SS-481, SSR-481, AGSS-471

See also 
 Armadillo-class tanker
 List of current ships of the United States Navy
 
 Type B ship - Trefoil-class concrete barge Type B7-D1

References

Citations

Sources